Nacka Fotbollsförening was a Swedish football team from Nacka, Stockholm County that was founded in 1990. Nacka FF played in Division 1. It went bankrupt in 2001.

Managers
Sören Åkeby

Players
Rami Shaaban

References

Defunct football clubs in Sweden